Croatian Railways (abbreviated as HŽ) is the national railway company of Croatia. Croatia is a member of the International Union of Railways (UIC). The UIC Country Code for Croatia is 78. The Croatian rail network carried 20.270 million passengers in 2018.

History
Croatian Railways was founded in 1991 from the former JŽ ("Yugoslav Railways") Zagreb Division, following Croatia's secession from Yugoslavia. Its vehicle fleet was initially the one found at the time of the breakup of Yugoslavia. It has been modernized over time, and further modernization is currently being carried out. The first railway section on the territory of today's Republic of Croatia, then part of Austrian Empire and Austria-Hungary, was built in 1860 in Međimurje: the railway line from Nagykanizsa in Hungary via Čakovec and Kotoriba continued to Pragerski in Slovenia. It is worth noting that this railway - although only a small part of it passed through Croatian territory (Međimurje was part of Croatia at the time the railway was built, but in January 1861, it was annexed to Hungary by the decision of Vienna) was built only 35 years after the first European railway, which was established in 1825 between the towns of Stockton and Darlington in England. Railroads that connected Rijeka, the most important port in Croatia, with Trieste (and further with Vienna), and with Zagreb (and further with Budapest ) were put into service in 1873.

Organisation

Until 1 November 2012, Croatian Railways was one single company, when in accordance EU Directive 91/440. requireing EU member states to separate "the management of railway operation and infrastructure from the provision of railway transport services, it was divided into three separate and independent companies:
 HŽ Cargo d.o.o. (responsible for cargo transport)
 HŽ Putnički prijevoz d.o.o. (responsible for passenger transport)
 HŽ Infrastruktura d.o.o. (responsible for railway Infrastructure)

Railway network
See List of railway lines in Croatia

Types of passenger train lines 
See Train categories in Europe - Croatia

Power systems 
The original decision in former Yugoslavia was to use 3 kV DC electrification for the railway network. This was performed on the Rijeka–Zagreb line, which due to the mountainous Gorski kotar region had a need for more powerful trains than the traditional diesel powered ones.

Beginning with the modernisation of the Zagreb–Belgrade railway line an electrification system of 25 kV/50 Hz was used. Electrification on other lines in Croatia was then made exclusively 25 kV/50 Hz. Later, the majority of the Zagreb–Rijeka line was re-electrified to 25 kV/50 Hz, but until December 2012 there was still a part that under 3 kV DC. Consequentially a power system break existed at Moravice. HŽ was considering the purchase of dual-voltage locomotives, as an alternative to full re-electrification of 3 kV DC tracks, but the idea was scrapped for good as all electrified railways in Croatia are now using 25 kV/50 Hz.

All railway power systems in Croatia are exclusively of type overhead catenary.

Rolling stock 
See Rolling stock of the Croatian Railways

Croatian speed record 
The maximum permitted speed of trains on the tracks in Croatia is 160 km/h. As far as the infrastructure is concerned, the specified speed can currently be achieved on part of the international corridor Novska - Tovarnik, more precisely on the relatively short sections Novska-Okučani and Vinkovci-Tovarnik.The current rail speed record in Croatia is 185 km/h. The record was set on the line between Novska and Nova Gradiška. The run was performed in order to demonstrate the possibilities offered by the Rade Končar built JŽ 442 electric locomotive class (now HŽ1142 train class).

See also 
 Transport in Croatia

References

External links 

 
 Map with all railway stations
 Forum about Croatian Railways - also with an English subforum
 Map
 Croatian stock list 
 Croatian withdrawn stock list 
 HŽ stock photo gallery

Transport companies of Croatia
Rail transport in Croatia
Railway companies established in 1991
Government-owned railway companies
Government-owned companies of Croatia
Companies based in Zagreb
Croatian companies established in 1991